Savignano sul Panaro is a comune (municipality) in the Province of Modena in the Italian region Emilia-Romagna, located about  west of Bologna and about  southeast of Modena. 

Savignano sul Panaro borders the following municipalities: Guiglia, Marano sul Panaro, San Cesario sul Panaro, Spilamberto, Valsamoggia, Vignola.

References

External links
 Official website

Cities and towns in Emilia-Romagna